The Story of a Discharged Prisoner (英雄本色; lit. "True Colors of a Hero"), also called Upright Repenter, is a 1967 Hong Kong film directed by Patrick Lung Kong.

The film partially inspired the 1986 John Woo film A Better Tomorrow, which has the same Chinese name. A Better Tomorrow combined plot elements of this film with the 1979 movie The Brothers, which in turn was a remake of 1975 Indian movie Deewaar.

Film name 
The film's alternative names include:
 Upright Repenter 
 Yingxiong Bense

Plot 
Lee Cheuk-hong (Patrick Tse) was a safecracker who was caught and spent more than 10 years behind bars. When One-Eyed Dragon (Sek Kin), leader of an organized crime, learns Lee Cheuk-Hong will be released, he send his men to ask Lee to join his gang.

Cast
 Patrick Tse - Lee Cheuk-hong
 Sek Kin - Boss Lung, One-eyed Dragon
 Mak Kei - Lung's thug
 Patrick Lung Kong - Inspector Lui
 Chan Tsai-Chung - Anna/Siu Yee-Tai
 Wong Wai - Lee Chi-sum
 Patsy Kar - Mok Si-Yan
 Sai Gwa-Pau - Ah Hon
 Mang Lee - Betty/Boss' girl
 Chow Gat - Lung's crony
 Do Ping - Kit
 Sze-Ma Wah-Lung - Chi-Sum's boss
 Ma Siu-Ying - Mother
 Yeung Yip-Wang - Anna's father
 Wong Hak - Cripple
 Hui Ying-Ying - Ah Hon's wife.
 Lee Sau-Kei - Anna's uncle
 Lam Yuk
 Chan Chung-Kin - DPAS chief
 Lee Keng-Ching - Shelter resident
 Chan Kau Fai
 Chan Lap-Ban - Squatter's village resident
 Go Chiu - Shelter resident
 Tang Cheung - Night watchman
 Chow Wai-Fong
 Fung Ming - Policeman
 Cheung Chok-Chow - Gang lawyer

Awards
In 2005, Story of a Discharged Prisoner was ranked 39th on the Hong Kong Film Awards list of the Top 100 Chinese Films. It was ranked number 21 on TimeOut Hong Kong Greatest 100 Hong Kong Films.

References

External links
 
 HK cinemagic entry
 The Story of a Discharged Prisoner at filmaffinity.com
 film at letterboxd.com
 film at hkmdb.com
 film at movingimage.us
 The Story of a Discharged Prisoner at senscritique.com

Hong Kong crime drama films
1967 films
1960s Cantonese-language films